No. 83 Expeditionary Air Group is a group within the Royal Air Force, currently based at Al Udeid Air Base in Qatar.

Originally formed in 1943, during the Second World War it formed part of the 2nd Tactical Air Force (2TAF) and was known as No. 83 (Composite) Group. It provided support to Allied forces during the liberation of Europe. After being disbanded in 1946 it was re-established as No. 83 Group in 1952 to lead the 2TAF's units in Germany, until it disbanded again in 1958.

On 1 April 2006 it was reformed as No. 83 Expeditionary Air Group Headquarters, to lead UK air operations in the Middle East. Activities include Operations Kipion (the UK's maritime presence in the Middle East) and Operation Shader (the UK's part of the military intervention against the Islamic State of Iraq and the Levant (ISIL)).

History

No. 83 (Composite) Group

No. 83 (Composite) Group was formed on 1 April 1943 within the Second Tactical Air Force of the Royal Air Force. By the eve of the D-Day landings in June 1944 , No. 83 Group had grown to a strength of twenty-nine fighter, ground-attack and reconnaissance squadrons and four artillery observation squadrons, grouped into ten wings. 

At the time of D-Day, the group consisted of:
 No. 39 Reconnaissance Wing RCAF
 Hawker Typhoon fighter-bombers
 No. 121 (Rocket Projectile) Wing RAF at Holmsley South
 No. 124 (Rocket Projectile) Wing RAF at Hurn
 No. 129 (Fighter Bomber) Wing RAF at Westhampnett
 No. 143 (RCAF) (Fighter) Wing RAF at Hurn
 Supermarine Spitfire fighters
 No. 125 (Fighter) Wing RAF at Ford
 No. 126 (RCAF) (Fighter) Wing RAF at Tangmere
 No. 127 (RCAF) (Fighter) Wing RAF at Tangmere
 No. 144 (RCAF) (Fighter) Wing RAF at Ford
 North American Mustangs
 No. 122 (Rocket Projectile) Wing RAF at Funtington

The Group headquarters was at RAF Eindhoven from 1 October 1944 to 10 April 1945. The group was absorbed into No. 84 Group RAF on 21 April 1946.

No. 83 Group

No. 83 Group was re-formed on 9 July 1952 within the Second Tactical Air Force in Germany to control its southern area. By 1956, the group controlled five wings with a total of fourteen squadrons equipped with Hawker Hunter day fighters, de Havilland Venom fighter-bombers, Supermarine Swift fighter-reconnaissance aircraft, Gloster Meteor night-fighters and English Electric Canberra interdiction and reconnaissance aircraft. It was disbanded again on 16 June 1958.

On 1 July 1956, No. 83 Group directed wings at RAF Bruggen, RAF Celle, RAF Geilenkirchen, RAF Wahn, and RAF Wildenrath.

Current operations
No. 83 Group was re-formed on 1 April 2006 from the UK Air Component Headquarters in the Middle East. It comprised No. 901 Expeditionary Air Wing in the Middle East and Bahrain and No. 902 Expeditionary Air Wing at Seeb in Oman. Since that time it has controlled a varying number of Expeditionary Air Wings. No. 83 Group is based at Al Udeid Air Base in Qatar.

The Air Officer Commanding No. 83 Group is the Air Component Commander in the Middle East. He is responsible to the Permanent Joint Headquarters for the command and control of all RAF units engaged in Operations Kipion and Shader.

It is currently in charge of:

901 Expeditionary Air Wing
 Provides support to No. 83 EAG and home to Joint Force Communication and Information Systems (Middle East).
902 Expeditionary Air Wing
 RAFO Musannah.
903 Expeditionary Air Wing
 RAF Akrotiri - Eurofighter Typhoon FGR4, Lockheed C-130J Hercules, Airbus A400M Atlas and Airbus Voyager.
906 Expeditionary Air Wing
 Al Minhad Air Base.

Commanders

1943 to 1946
 Air Vice Marshal W F Dickson, 4 April 1943 – 25 March 1944 
 AVM H Broadhurst, 25 March 1944 – 1 September 1945
 AVM T C Traill, 9 September 1945 – 21 April 1946

1952 to 1958
Air Commodore R B Lees, 8 September 1952 – 22 August 1955.
 AVM H A V Hogan, 22 August 1955 – 16 June 1958.

2006 to present
 Air Commodore B M North, 1 April 2006 – 13 September 2006
 Air Commodore C A Bairsto, 13 September 2006 – 12 January 2007
 Air Commodore P Oborn, 12 January 2007 – 10 July 2007
 Air Commodore M J Harwood, 10 July 2007 – 16 August 2008
 Air Commodore A S Barmby, 16 August 2008 – 22 May 2009
 Air Commodore S D Atha, 22 May 2009 – 31 January 2010
 Air Commodore K B McCann, 31 January 2010 – 6 January 2011
 Air Commodore A D Stevenson, 6 January 2011 – 15 December 2011
 Air Commodore S D Forward, 15 December 2011 – 21 December 2012
 Air Commodore P J Beach, 21 December 2012 – 14 December 2013
 Air Commodore A Gillespie, 14 December 2013 – 1 December 2014
 Air Commodore M Sampson, 1 December 2014 – 23 October 2016
 Air Commodore John J Stringer, 23 October 2016 – 22 October 2017
 Air Commodore R J Dennis, 22 October 2017 – 21 October 2018
 Air Commodore Justin Reuter, 21 October 2018 – 20 October 2019
 Air Commodore Tim Jones, 20 October 2019 – September 2020
 Air Commodore Simon Strasdin, September 2020 – September 2021
 Air Commodore Mark Farrell, September 2021 –

References

Citations

Bibliography

External links
 
Air of Authority – A History of RAF Organisation, Groups 70 – 106, accessed 1 June 2008

Military units and formations established in 1943
083
British forces in Germany
Royal Air Force groups of the Second World War